Matteo Zocarini was an 18th-century Italian composer.  His biographical details are unknown.

The only pieces of music known from him are 6 concertini for cello and basso continuo, printed around 1740. The sheet music incorrectly states that it was printed by the noted Amsterdam music publisher Michel-Charles Le Cène; the true publisher is unknown. The cover of this sheet music refers to Zocarini as an amatore della musica, or musical amateur.

It is understood that Zocarini was a virtuous cellist, thus the special attention for this instrument in his composing work. There is a possibility that he played in Paris under the name Zuccharini in 1737.

The character of the music composed by Zocarini is described as comparable with Bach's Italian Concert.

References

External links
 Haendel.it: Matteo Zocarini, shows the cover of the original 1740 sheet music                                                                                                   abcde
 

18th-century Italian composers
Italian male composers